This is the progression of world record improvements of the hammer throw W35 division of Masters athletics.

Key

References

Masters athletics world record progressions